GreatCell Solar Limited previously known as Dyesol, was a solar energy company developing perovskite solar cell 3rd generation thin-film solar cell technologies and materials. The company was previously focused on developing dye-sensitized solar cell (DSC or DSSC) technology but then focused on perovskite solar cells, and assisted manufacturing partners to produce perovskite photovoltaic modules. The company was based in Queanbeyan, Australia and opened its manufacturing and research facilities in October 2008. It expanded to several locations around the world, including the UK and Switzerland, and established joint ventures in South Korea and Singapore.

The company was predominantly focused on perovskite solar cell and materials development, with numerous academic and corporate partnerships trying to commercialize modules based on both glass and metal substrates by 2019 and 2020, respectively. In July 2017, a memorandum of understanding was signed with the world's largest solar panel manufacturer Jinko Solar which was hoped to lead to large scale deployment of the technology. In October 2018, the Materials Division of Greatcell Solar was spun off, in a new business called Greatcell Solar Materials (GSM), based in Queanbeyan.

In December 2018, GreatCell Solar Limited entered administration and was put into liquidation in September 2019.

Greatcell Solar Materials still operates as a manufacturer and supplier of materials (including perovskite precursors, dyes and titania pastes) for renewable energy systems applications to the photovoltaics research sector and the electronics industry.

DSC development and company history 

Dye-sensitized solar cell technology was invented at the Institute of Physical Chemistry, Swiss Federal Institute of Technology in Lausanne, Switzerland in 1988 by Brian O'Regan and Michael Graetzel. Their paper A low-cost, high-efficiency solar cell based on dye-sensitized colloidal TiO2 films, published in 1991 in the journal, Nature, spawned a new research field and a new route to harvest electrical power from sunlight. Since that time Michael Grätzel, now at Switzerland's École Polytechnique Fédérale de Lausanne (EPFL), has received numerous awards and accolades in relation to the invention of DSCs, and maintained close links to Dyesol as Chairman of Dyesol's Technical Advisory Board.

From 1994, STI and Greatcell teams in Australia and Switzerland developed DSC technology and established the world's first DSC prototype manufacturing facility in Australia in 2000.  Key to that development phase was the invention of processes, new materials, and equipment to manufacture DSC products. Dyesol acquired the laboratory, manufacturing equipment and intellectual property which has resulted in a large portfolio of patents.  Dyesol further acquired STI in 2006 and Greatcell in 2007.

Dyesol Limited was formed in 2004 to accelerate the commercial development of DSC technology and build on the DSC work of previous 14 years carried out by Sustainable Technologies International Pty Ltd ("STI"), Greatcell Solar S.A. ("Greatcell"), and Switzerland's École Polytechnique Fédérale de Lausanne (EPFL). It was listed on the Australian Stock Exchange in 2005 (DYE) and the German Open Market (D5I.F), and is trading on the OTCQX (DYSOY) through its depositary BNY Mellon.

In May 2013 Dyesol announced that Dye-sensitized Solar Cell (DSC) technology has achieved a technical breakthrough by achieving a solid-state DSC (ss-DSC) efficiency of 11.3% at full sun. The technology is particularly important in solar markets where light conditions are sub-optimal, such as Europe, North America and North-East Asia, or low-light conditions (such as indoor applications) where much higher efficiencies over 30% can be achieved.

On July 11, 2013, Dyesol /EPFL announced a new record DSC efficiency. Michael Grätzel stated "Our research work on solid-state Dye Solar Cells (ss-DSC) is now achieving efficiencies exceeding 15%". However, this is now considered a perovskite solar cell and the official accredited DSC solar cell efficiency is 11.9% determined by the National Renewable Energy Laboratory. This efficiency is not expected to greatly increase as the DSC field has largely shifted to the development of perovskite solar cells which have achieved certified efficiencies over 23%.

Subsidiaries and Partnerships 

Subsidiaries
 Dyesol-Timo Co Ltd (ssDSC & Liquid DSC on Glass / Polymers / Steel), South Korea
 Dyesol Automotive Bavaria GmbH (ssDSC & Liquid DSC for Automotive), Germany
 Dyesol-Printed Power Pte Ltd (Research into Combined Energy Generation and Storage (CEGS)), Singapore

Academic and R&D Partners
 EPFL On going research mainly into Solid State DSC (ssDSC), Switzerland
 Nanyang Technological University Research into Solid State DSC (ssDSC), Singapore
 CSIRO Research into Solid State DSC (ssDSC), Australia
 Australian Nuclear Science and Technology Organisation ANSTO, Australia
 Bangor University
 University of Sheffield
 University of Manchester
 Swansea University
 SPECIFIC Wales
 AkzoNobel Performance Coatings
 TATA Steel Europe Colorcoat Steel Roofing & Siding
 BASF Chemicles 
 Alcro-Beckers AB Paint
 Nippon Sheet Glass Glass
 EPSRC
 Innovate UK

Commercial Partners
 Merck KGaA (Supplying electrolytes, ionic liquids)
 Sigma-Aldrich (Global Distribution of DSC and ssDSC Materials)
 TASNEE (Assistance with future funding and guarantees), Saudi Arabia
 Cristal (Supplying Nano-Titania for use by Dyesol partners), Saudi Arabia

Suppliers
 Sefar AG Supplying transparent conducting film for use by Dyesol partners 
 Pilkington Supplying Transparent Conductive Oxides for use by Dyesol partners 
 Umicore Supplying liquid DSC dyes for use by Dyesol partners
 SIA Engineering Company/Meerkat Manufacturing facilities for use by Dyesol Partners

Industrial Consumers
 G24 Innovations Ltd. (Dyes)
 Nesli DSC (Turkey)

Distribution
 TATA Steel Europe Colorcoat Steel Roofing & Siding
 ThyssenKrupp 
 CSR Viridian

References

External links 
 Dyesol
 Hoang Giang Solar
 Science Magazine:- Newcomer Juices Up the Race to Harness Sunlight
 Turkey Takes Important DSC Commercialisation Steps
   Dyesol Limited has signed a Global Distribution Agreement with Sigma-Aldrich® Corporation 
   Cheaper Perovskite could replace Silicon in Solar Cells
   PVTEC :-  Dyesol mulling pilot line phases for perovskite thin-film products
   2-DTech & Dyesol secures grants for Innovation

Photovoltaics manufacturers
Dye-sensitized solar cells
Technology companies of Australia
Companies listed on the Australian Securities Exchange